Mojtaba Jabbari (born June 16, 1983 in Robat Karim) is a retired Iranian football player who played mostly for Esteghlal and the Iranian national team as an attacking midfielder.

Club career

Early years
Due to his father's career as an employee for Islamic Republic of Iran Railways, Jabbari began his club football playing for Rah Ahan. His coach at the club, Ahadi soon moved to Esteghlal youth team, and took Jabbari with him. To gain experience, he was loaned out to Aboomoslem. He was part of the team that went to final of the Hazfi Cup with Aboomoslem.

Esteghlal
There heafter a solid rejoined Esteghlal in the 2005–06 season.  He helped the team win the championship that season.

In 2006, he got injured and was not ready to play until the second half of 2006–07 season, in which he made a comeback in a 20-minute appearance vs. Saipa on January 27, 2007. He is back to the club's starting lineup for the 2007–08 season. He was a key player in Esteghlal's Hazfi Cup final victory Pegah scoring and assisting a goal in the 3–0 win on a day which he lost his father. He scored Esteghlal's first goal of the 2008–09 season in a 2–0 victory over former club Aboomoslem.

Jabbari was on trial with Grenoble Foot 38 of French Ligue 1 but was not signed as Grenoble Foot 38 ran into financial problems. He had some problems with the club coach after the first AFC Champions League and was fined by the club.
He started the 2009–10 season as usual with injury where he was out for most of the season and only featured in few matches but in 2010–11 season, he was able to become one of the regular players. He scored a goal in the Tehran derby on September 16, 2011 and was selected as best player of the match. He won the Hazfi Cup for the second time in this season. He also helped Esteghlal to win league title in 2012–13 season after four years.

Sepahan
After multiple rather harsh criticism he had made against the management of the club over the past few years, in early July 2013 after some unsuccessful preliminary negotiations to extend his contract the club's chairman decided not to move forward till he officially apologized for his remarks. At the same time, Jabbari claimed that he had been waiting for an apology from the club for about 2 weeks. Eventually no apology was exchanged and on July 6, 2013 he signed a one-year contract with Sepahan. After playing just five games for Sepahan, he was fired by Sepahan coach Zlatko Kranjčar and was banned from training.

Al Ahli
On October 1, 2013, Jabbari signed a one-year loan contract with Al Ahli of Qatar Stars League. In January 2014 Jabbari completed a permanent move to Al Ahli, he signed a two-year, $3.5 million contract. He finished the season with scoring five goals and assisting six times in twenty one matches.

Jabbari scored the first two goals of the 2014–15 season in Al Ahli's 4–1 win over Al-Sailiya. He also assisted two goals in Al Ahli's second game against Qatar SC. On September 3, 2014, Jabbari was named as August's Player of the Month. The award makes him the first ever winner in Qatar Stars League's history. On March 10, 2015, Al Ahli extended Jabbari's contract until 2017.

Return to Esteghlal

Jabbari returned to Esteghlal after four years in July 2017. After a while he was in trouble with club chairman, Reza Eftekhari which lead to his departure from the team after four games in Iran pro league. He announced his retirement on 10 July 2018.

Club career statistics
Last update: July 17, 2018

 Assist goals

International career

While playing for Aboomoslem, Jabbari was called up to the national team camps several times, but was not able to create a place for himself in the team. He also played for Iran B team in the Islamic Solidarity Games held in Saudi Arabia. Soon after he was called up to the national team again, and made his international debut versus Bosnia on February 2, 2005. After his impressive displays the following season in Esteghlal, he was a constant call up to the national team and there was some chance that he might have been a starter. He played the last match of Iran against Japan in the 2006 FIFA World Cup qualification then he was called up for Iran's preliminary World Cup 2006 squad, but missed the tournament as he was injured during training in Switzerland.

The injury kept him out of Team Melli for 2007, but came back to the team in January 2008 for the 2010 FIFA World Cup qualification campaign.

He was recalled by Carlos Queiroz in 2011 and was scored his first national goal on October 11, 2011 against Bahrain. He was also scored another goal in the match with Bahrain on November 11, 2011 in the 2014 FIFA World Cup qualification and later on performed in 2015 AFC Asian Cup qualification as well.

In April 2014, he announced he would be retiring from the national team.

International goals
Scores and results list Iran's goal tally first.

Personal life
Jabbari's family is Iranian Azerbaijani from the Ardabil city of Ardabil Province.

Honours

Club
Aboomoslem
Hazfi Cup:
Runner-up (1): 2004–05

Esteghlal
Iranian Football League:
Winner (3): 2005–06, 2008–09, 2012–13
Runner-up (1): 2010–11
Hazfi Cup:
Winner (2): 2007–08, 2011–12

National
Islamic Solidarity Games: 2005 (Bronze Medal)

Individual
Iran Pro League top goal assistant: 2007–08
Qatar Stars League Player of the Month: August 2014

Notes

External links
 Official Website
 Mojtaba Jabari at TeamMelli.com
 

1983 births
Living people
Iranian footballers
Iranian expatriate footballers
Iran international footballers
Association football midfielders
F.C. Aboomoslem players
Esteghlal F.C. players
Al Ahli SC (Doha) players
Qatar Stars League players
Persian Gulf Pro League players
Expatriate footballers in Qatar
People from Tehran